John R. Evans (born February 15, 1955) is a former Republican member of the Pennsylvania House of Representatives. He represented the 5th District from 2001 through 2013. Evans' district consisted of parts of Erie County and most of western Crawford County.

Evans is a graduate of Linesville High School, which was merged into Conneaut Area Senior High School. He holds degrees in communications from Edinboro University. Then he went on to become the sports director and later news reporter at WJET-TV in Erie. After broadcasting, he briefly worked for Erie Insurance.

References

External links
Profile from the Pennsylvania House Website

1955 births
Living people
People from Meadville, Pennsylvania
American people of Welsh descent
Republican Party members of the Pennsylvania House of Representatives
Edinboro University of Pennsylvania alumni